Dora Jemaa-Amirouche (born 15 July 1985, at Oullins) is a  French athlete, who specializes in the 400 hurdles.

Biography  
She won two champion of France  titles at the 400 meters hurdles, in 2006 and 2010, and she also won national title for the Indoors 400 m in 2008.

Prize list  
 French Championships in Athletics   :  
 winner 400 hurdles in 2006 and 2010   
 French Indoor athletics Championships:  
 winner of the 400m 2008

Records

Notes and references

External links  
 

1985 births
Living people
French female hurdlers
People from Oullins
Sportspeople from Lyon Metropolis
21st-century French women